Ornithodoros is a genus in the soft-bodied tick family, Argasidae.

Physiology
The opening between the midgut and hindgut has been lost, making the ticks unable to pass digestive waste products out of their bodies.

Taxonomy
The Linnean name derives from ornithos and doros, meaning "bird" and "gift", respectively.

It contains these species:

Ornithodoros alactagalis Issaakjan, 1936
†Ornithodoros antiquus Poinar, 1995
Ornithodoros apertus Walton, 1962
Ornithodoros arenicolous Hoogstraal, 1953
Ornithodoros asperus Warburton, 1918
Ornithodoros atacamensis Muñoz-Leal, Venzal & González-Acuña, 2016
Ornithodoros brasiliensis Aragão, 1923
Ornithodoros cholodkovskyi Pavlovsky, 1930
Ornithodoros compactus Walton, 1962
Ornithodoros coniceps Canestrini, 1890
Ornithodoros costalis Diatta, Bouattour, Durand, Renaud & Trape, 2013
Ornithodoros coriaceus Koch, 1844
Ornithodoros eremicus Cooley & Kohls, 1941
Ornithodoros faccinii Barros-Battesti, Landulfo & Luz, 2015
Ornithodoros furcosus Neumann, 1908
Ornithodoros graingeri Heisch & Guggisberg, 1953
Ornithodoros grenieri Klein, 1965
Ornithodoros gurneyi Warburton, 1926
Ornithodoros hermsi Wheeler, Herms & Meyer, 1935
Ornithodoros indica Rau & Rao, 1971
Ornithodoros kairouanensis Trape, Diatta, Bouattour, Durand & Renaud, 2013
Ornithodoros kelleyi Cooley & Kohls, 1941
Ornithodoros knoxjonesi Jones & Clifford, 1972
Ornithodoros lahillei Venzal, González-Acuña & Nava, 2015
Ornithodoros macmillani (Hoogstraal & Kohls, 1966)
Ornithodoros madagascariensis Hoogstraal, 1962
Ornithodoros marocanus Velu, 1919
Ornithodoros merionesi Trape, Diatta, Belghyti, Sarih, Durand & Renaud, 2013
Ornithodoros moubata (Murray, 1877)
Ornithodoros nattereri Warburton, 1927
Ornithodoros nicollei Mooser, 1932
Ornithodoros normandi Larrousse, 1923 
Ornithodoros occidentalis Trape, Diatta, Durand & Renaud, 2013
Ornithodoros parkeri Cooley, 1936
Ornithodoros porcinus Walton, 1962
Ornithodoros procaviae Theodor & Costa, 1960
Ornithodoros quilinensis Venzal, Nava, Mangold, Mastropaolo, Casás & Guglielmone, 2012
Ornithodoros rietcorreai Labruna, Nava & Venzal, 2016
Ornithodoros rostratus Aragão, 1911
Ornithodoros rupestris Trape, Bitam, Renaud & Durand, 2013
Ornithodoros saraivai Muñoz-Leal & Labruna, 2017
Ornithodoros savignyi (Audouin, 1827)
Ornithodoros sawaii Kitaoka & Suzuki, 1973
Ornithodoros sonrai Sautet & Witkowski, 1943
Ornithodoros steini (Schulze, 1935)
Ornithodoros tartakovskyi Olenev, 1931 
Ornithodoros tholozani Laboulbène & Mégnin, 1882
Ornithodoros transversus (Banks, 1902)
Ornithodoros turicata (Dugès, 1876)
Ornithodoros xerophylus Venzal, Mangold & Nava, 2015
Ornithodoros zumpti Heisch & Guggisberg, 1953

Carios erraticus was previously placed in this genus, as Ornithodoros erraticus.

References

Ticks
Acari genera
Argasidae
Taxa named by Carl Ludwig Koch